Ör is a district in Sundbyberg Municipality with 6550 inhabitants (in 2019), and a suburb in the Stockholm metropolitan area. It is located east of Hallonbergen, and consists of multiresidential buildings from the 1960s. Northern Ör consists of a bus depot, a substation, a school, forest, stables and sports areas.

References

Stockholm urban area
Populated places in Sundbyberg Municipality